Alfredo Landa Areta MML (3 March 19339 May 2013) was a Spanish actor.

Biography 
He was born in Pamplona, Navarre, Spain. He finished his pre-university studies in San Sebastián. He then began university studies on Law, where he began to work with university school groups. He left university to work in the theater.

After working as a dubbing actor for a short time in the 1950s, he debuted with his first considerable role in film in José María Forqué's Atraco a las tres in 1962.

When Francisco Franco died in 1975, censorship began to disappear. This led to a growth of erotic comedies on Spanish cinema. Landa became the "sexually repressed" role of that trend, especially under directors Mariano Ozores and Pedro Lazaga. He even created his own trend, that some people called landismo.

Afterwards, Landa changed his image, taking much deeper roles, like his bandit in El Bosque animado.

Landa, along with Francisco Rabal, won Best Actor award at 1984 Cannes Film Festival for his memorable performance in Los santos inocentes.

He is now widely recognized as a great dramatic actor.
 
After a career with more than one hundred and twenty movies, one dozen of television series, and several stage successes, with a great amount of Spanish and European awards, 74-year-old Landa announced his retirement at the X Festival de Cine de Málaga (10th Movie Festival of Málaga) while receiving a new award.

Landa died on May 9, 2013 following complications from Alzheimer's disease at the age of 80.

Filmography

Awards and nominations 
In 2008 he received the Prince of Viana Prize from the Government of Navarre for promoting his homeland, but he also has received many film prizes throughout his career:

Cannes Film Festival

Goya Awards

Fotogramas de Plata

Spanish Actor's Guild

TP de Oro

Círculo de Escritores Cinematográficos

Honours 
 Gold Medal of Merit in Labour (Kingdom of Spain, 5 December 2008).

References

External links 

1933 births
2013 deaths
Male actors from Navarre
People from Pamplona
Spanish male film actors
Spanish male voice actors
Best Actor Goya Award winners
Cannes Film Festival Award for Best Actor winners
Honorary Goya Award winners
Deaths from Alzheimer's disease
Deaths from dementia in Spain